Pimperne Hundred was a hundred in the county of Dorset, England, containing the following parishes:

Bryanston
Durweston
Fifehead Neville
Hammoon
Hazelbury Bryan
Iwerne Stepleton
Langton Long Blandford
Pimperne
Stourpaine
Tarrant Hinton
Tarrant Keyneston
Tarrant Launceston
Tarrant Rawston
Winterborne Houghton
Winterborne Stickland

See also
List of hundreds in Dorset

Sources
Boswell, Edward, 1833: The Civil Division of the County of Dorset (published on CD by Archive CD Books Ltd, 1992)
Hutchins, John, History of Dorset, vols 1-4 (3rd ed 1861–70; reprinted by EP Publishing, Wakefield, 1973)
Mills, A. D., 1977, 1980, 1989: Place Names of Dorset, parts 1–3. English Place Name Society: Survey of English Place Names vols LII, LIII and 59/60

Hundreds of Dorset